The association football tournament at the 2007 Southeast Asian Games was held from 1 to 14 December in Nakhon Ratchasima Province of Thailand. The men's tournament is played by U-23 (under 23 years old) national teams, while the women's tournament has no age limit.

Hosts Thailand won gold in both men's and women's tournament, beating Myanmar and Vietnam respectively. Singapore won the bronze medal at the men's tournament, their first after 12 years while Myanmar won bronze of the women's.

Venues

Medal winners

Football

Futsal

Men's tournament

Participants

Squads

Group stage

Group A

Group B

Knockout stages

Semi-finals

Bronze-medal match

Gold-medal match

Winners

Goalscorers

 6 goals
  Anon Sangsanoi

 5 goals
  Teerathep Winothai

 4 goals
   Fazrul Nawaz

 3 goals
  Lê Công Vinh
  Si Thu Than

 2 goals
  Teab Vathanak
  Mohd Safee Mohd Sali
  Mohd Amirul Hadi Zainal
  Si Thu Win
  Sharil Ishak
  Agu Casmir
  Wuttichai Tathong
  Phan Thanh Bình

 1 goal
  Kouch Sokumpheak
  Airlangga Sucipto
  Imanuel Wanggai
  Ardan Aras
  Jajang Mulyana
  Lamnao Singto
  Chun Keng Hong
  Mohd Safiq Rahim
  Yazar Win Thein
  Pai Soe
  Teerasil Dangda
  Apipu Suntornpanavej
  Adul Lahso
  Tana Chanabut
  Prat Samakrat
  Võ Duy Nam
  Đoàn Việt Cường

 Own goals

  Prat Samakrat (Playing against Myanmar)
  Đoàn Việt Cường (Playing against Singapore)

Final ranking

Women's tournament

Participants

Group A

Group B

Knockout stages

Semi-finals

Bronze-medal match

Gold-medal match

Winners

Goalscorers

 4 goals
  Junpen Seesraum
  Nisa Romyen
  Đỗ Thị Ngọc Châm
  Nguyễn Thị Minh Nguyệt
 3 goals
  Khin Marlar Tun
  San Yu Naing
  Anootsara Maijarern
  Pitsamai Sornsai
  Đoàn Thị Kim Chi
 2 goals
  Aye Nandar Hlaing
  Margrat Marri
  Supaporn Gaewbaen
  Bùi Thị Tuyết Mai

 1 goal
  Johny Sayasanh
  Phaivanh Souphavanh
  Teng Sengmany
  Moe Moe War
  My Nilar Htwe
  Edna Agravante
  Patrice Impelido
  Kitiya Thiangtham
  Sunisa Srangthaisong
  Trần Thị Kim Hồng
  Vũ Thị Huyền Linh
 Own goal
  Khuanta Sehhonivong (Playing against Myanmar)
  Sangvan Inthasvong (Playing against Vietnam)

Final ranking

External links
Southeast Asian Games Official Results

 
football
Football at the Southeast Asian Games
2007
2007–08 in Indonesian football
2007 in Thai football
2007 in Malaysian football
2007 in Singaporean football
2007 in Burmese football
2007 in Vietnamese football
2007 in Philippine football
2007 in Laotian football
2007 in Cambodian football
2007 in women's association football